Qamishaleh or Qami Sheleh or Qamishleh may refer to:
 Qamishaleh, Marivan
 Qamishleh, Sarshiv, Saqqez County
 Qamishleh, Ziviyeh, Saqqez County